The Newark Club Cricket Alliance (NCCA) Sunday League serves a swathe of cricket clubs across the south and east of Nottinghamshire. Albeit the East Midland's most Newark centric Sunday cricket league, the headquarters for the NCCA is based in Bolsover, Derbyshire. The NCCA has a long history dating back to the early 1970s, with Farndon becoming champions of Division 1 in 1973.

The Newark Club Cricket Alliance operates mainly in the south and east of Nottinghamshire, but clubs are known to participate from beyond the county boundary, with representatives from Lincolnshire, Leicestershire and Derbyshire. In 2014 the League Management Committee recommended a 30-mile radius from Newark for new clubs joining the league. The NCCA has around 40 clubs playing in 5 divisions, with a guideline of no more than 11 Clubs per division.

Champions
 

 

 

Source:

Division 1 performance by season from 2008

References

External links
 

English domestic cricket competitions
Cricket in Nottinghamshire
Club cricket